Emily Matilda Manning, pen-name Australie (13 May 1845 – 25 August 1890)  was an Australian journalist and writer.

Career

Manning was born in Sydney, New South Wales, Australia, the daughter of William Montagu Manning.

Manning married, in 1873, Henry Heron, a solicitor in Sydney. Having visited England, where she remained for two years and a half, she adopted literary pursuits, and contributed tales and essays to the Sydney Morning Herald and The Sydney Mail. Manning exchanged poems with David Scott Mitchell in 1864, suggesting a romance between them. She also published a volume of poems, entitled The Balance of Pain and Other Poems (George Bell & Sons: London, 1877), and died in Blandville, Sydney, on 25 August 1890.

Australie Close, in the Canberra suburb of Gilmore, is named in her honour.

Bibliography

Novels
 Cupid on a Swiss Tour (1875)
 The Story of a Royal Pendulum (1890)

Poetry
 The Balance of Pain and Other Poems (1877)

References

1845 births
1890 deaths
Poets from Sydney
19th-century poets
19th-century Australian women